Christian Bay (1921 – May 8, 1990) was a Canadian political theorist and the chairman of the political science department at the University of Alberta in Canada. He formed the ideological basis for the Caucus for a New Political Science of the APSA and an important critique of Behavioral Politics. He is associated with Normative Political Science and the New institutionalism approach of politics.

Bay was born in Oslo and received his Ph.D. at the University of Oslo in 1959, with his book The Structure of Freedom serving as his doctoral dissertation. This work was a psychological study of the quest for freedom and later that year earned him the Woodrow Wilson Foundation's 1959 book award.

Bay went on to teach in the United States at Stanford University and the University of California, Berkeley before becoming chairman of the political science department at the University of Alberta in Edmonton in 1966. He joined the University of Toronto faculty in 1972 and retired in 1988. He died on May 8, 1990 of pneumonia at Toronto Western Hospital.

References

External links 
 
 Christian Bay archival papers held at the University of Toronto Archives and Records Management Services
 

1921 births
1990 deaths
Canadian political scientists
Norwegian political scientists
Norwegian emigrants to Canada
Stanford University faculty
Academic staff of the University of Alberta
University of California, Berkeley College of Letters and Science faculty
University of Oslo alumni
Academic staff of the University of Toronto
Norwegian expatriates in the United States
20th-century political scientists
Naturalized citizens of Canada